Caprinia felderi is a moth in the family Crambidae. It was described by Julius Lederer in 1863. It is found in India (Assam), on Java and Ambon Island, as well as in Australia, where it has been recorded from Queensland.

References

Moths described in 1863
Spilomelinae